Ankahee (English: Unsaid) is a 1984 Indian drama film directed by Amol Palekar and starring Amol Palekar, Deepti Naval and Dr. Shriram Lagoo. It was based on the Marathi-language play Kalay Tasmai Namaha by C. T. Khanolkar. The film is also noted for its soundtrack, which won two awards at the 32nd National Film Awards, including Best Music Direction for  Jaidev and  Best Male Playback Singer for noted classical singer Pt. Bhimsen Joshi. Asha Bhosle also sang a song, "Kauno Thagwa Nagariya". Director Amol Palekar's next film in the dual role of actor-director was Samaantar (2009).

Story

Well known Indian astrologer Jyotibhaskar Pandit Satyanarayan Chaturvedi wishes good luck to a doctor, who is about to perform surgery on a woman, but also tells him that the patient will not survive. The doctor (a non-believer in Astrology) scoffs at this, and proceeds to the operation theatre. However, just as the astrologer had predicted, the patient dies.

The astrologer lives with his wife, Devaki, and their son, Nandu. The astrologer would like to see Nandu marrying a woman named Indu Agnihotri. But Nandu loves Sushma Chatopadhyay and wants to marry her.

It is at this stage that the father tells his son that he is destined to marry twice in his lifetime, with his first wife dying within eleven months of their marriage, after which he will remarry.

An educated Nandu must now decide, whether to believe his father, let go of Sushma, and explore an option of marrying her after she dies, or, defy his astrological beliefs and marry her, with a possible eventuality of her death within eleven months of their marriage.

Cast

Soundtrack
All the songs are composed by Jaidev, and feature semi-classical and devotional songs.
 Raghubar Tumako Meri Laaj: Bhimsen Joshi, Tulsidas (Lyrics)
 Thumak Thumak Pag Dumak Kunj Madhu: Bhimsen Joshi, Traditional
 Mujhko Bhi Radha Bana Le Nandlal (sad): Asha Bhosle
 "Nagariya lutal ho thagwa": Asha Bhosle

Awards
 32nd National Film Award
Best Music Direction: Jaidev
 National Film Award for Best Male Playback Singer: Bhimsen Joshi: Thumak Thumak
 1985: Filmfare Award
 Best Story: C. T. Khanolkar: Nominated

References

External links
 

1984 films
Indian films based on plays
1980s Hindi-language films
Films scored by Jaidev
Films directed by Amol Palekar